Whigfield is an Italian dance act fronted by Danish singer, songwriter and record producer Sannie Charlotte Carlson (born 11 April 1970), known by her various stage names including Whigfield, Naan, or simply Sannie. She is best known for her 1993 single "Saturday Night", which became an international hit the following year.

Based in Italy at the time, Carlson worked with Italian producer Larry Pignagnoli and "Saturday Night" entered the top five in Italy. Her single "Another Day" also managed to peak at number three in Italy as well. The single "Sexy Eyes" also charted in a number of other markets, along with "Another Day" and "Think of You" which entered the top ten in the United Kingdom, Switzerland, Norway, and her native Denmark.

She competed in the Dansk Melodi Grand Prix 2018 with the song "Boys on Girls" but didn't qualify for the superfinal.

Early life
Carlson was born in Skælskør, Denmark. She spent several years in Africa as a child before returning to her native country. Before singing Carlson worked as a model and studied music. Carlson played in a duo before she met the producer Larry Pignagnoli and took on the name "Whigfield" as a tribute to her school music teacher.

Discography

Studio albums

Compilation albums

Singles

Promotional singles

References

External links

 Sannie Carlson's official website
 Whigfield's official website

1970 births
21st-century Danish actresses
English-language singers from Denmark
Eurodance musicians
Danish expatriates in Italy
Danish dance musicians
Danish pop singers
Danish record producers
Danish songwriters
Dansk Melodi Grand Prix contestants
Living people
People from Slagelse Municipality
21st-century Danish women  singers
Danish women record producers